Odysseus is the fourth studio album by Nigerian rapper and record producer Jesse Jagz. It was released on September 8, 2017, by Jagz Nation. The album features guest appearances from Hotyce, Styl-Plus, Cynthia Morgan, Melon and Burna Boy. Prior to releasing the album, Jesse Jagz released a number of singles in 2017, including "Midnight Vibes" and "New World". "Best in You" was released as the album's lead and only single. Odysseus draws influences from Caribbean sounds, supporting the dancehall identity that Jesse Jagz embraced on his second studio album Jagz Nation, Vol.1. Thy Nation Come (2013).

Background and artwork
Jesse Jagz originally began production on Odysseus in August 2014. The album was initially scheduled for release in 2015, but was delayed multiple times. Its title was inspired by the Greek king Odysseus. Although built on a predominantly hip-hop foundation, some of the tracks on Odysseus are infused with Caribbean riddim and patois-laced rap. In June 2017, Jesse Jagz unveiled the album's cover on his Instagram page. The cover features a picture of his mother, Lydia Abaga, as a child. In it, his mother can be seen sitting with Reverend Jan Boer's three biological children. The photo was taken in the grounds of Boer's idyllic Jos home. Jesse Jagz performed tracks from the album to select listeners at Industry Nite. The event was held on June 28, 2017, at Spice Route in Victoria Island, Lagos.

Music and composition
On the album's opener "Genesis", Jesse Jagz channels Drake and is reminiscent of his life's journey. He can be heard rapping over ambient layers of vocal harmonies. Reviewing for Filter Free Nigeria, Ehis Combs said the song is "repetitive" and has a "one-dimensional rhyme pattern". "Wide and Blue" contains an alternate piano sample of "Murder She Wrote", as performed by Chaka Demus & Pliers. The Hotyce-assisted track "Dirty" is composed of bass, percussions, drums and a trap instrumental. "Best in You" explores themes of romantic declarations, assurance, doubt and paranoia. The song contains the nursery rhyme "Row, Row, Row Your Boat" and a sample of Lighthouse Family's "Ocean Drive". Oris Aigbokhaevbolo said "Best in You" is "lyrical cohesive" and that its "delivery, slurred and semi-comical, takes some imagination".

The nostalgic track "Alright" features vocals by R&B group Styl-Plus. A writer for YNaija described "Alright" as an oversight from the album and further stated that it is a "cheap attempt at nostalgia, filtered through heavy bass and auto-tune". In "Ghetto Youth", Jesse Jagz tells the story of life as witnessed on the streets. In "Wide And Blue", he comes to terms with his mortality, infusing the song with drug metaphors and pseudo-religious messages. In a lukewarm review of "Wide and Blue", Debola Abimbolu of Native magazine said the "disjointed narrative between the verses and the hook makes the lyrics unconvincing and the rhymes lacking of the cumulative effect". The Burna Boy-assisted track "Violation" is a blend of boom bap rap and dancehall. Combs believes the song is "one of the brightest moments on the project".

Critical reception

Odysseus received mixed reviews from music critics. In a review for Native magazine, Debola Abimbolu said Odysseus isn’t a "genre blending masterpiece worthy of Yeezus status nor hip-hop enough to be Illmatic, yet, its aspiration to somehow draw parallels with such projects is admirable enough to be applauded." Oris Aigbokhaevbolo of Music in Africa opined that the first half of Odysseus is flawless, but ended the review saying Jesse Jagz did not make a perfect album this time.

In a less enthusiastic review, a writer for Pulse Nigeria called the album "average" and said it is "not a project that provides enjoyment, neither does it do anything well enough to stand out". Ehis Combs, writing for Filter Free Nigeria, stated: "Whilst not being a bad album in any way, Odysseus sounded like a tired and recycled Jesse Jagz who finally tries to conform to trending sounds." Dennis Peter of Filter Free Nigeria praised the album's production but ended the review saying the "average nature of the project left him with a familiar feeling".

Track listing

Notes
"Best in You" contains the nursery rhyme "Row, Row, Row Your Boat", and samples the chorus of Lighthouse Family's "Ocean Drive".
"Wide and Blue" contains an alternate piano sample of "Murder She Wrote", as performed by Chaka Demus & Pliers.

Personnel

Jesse Garba Abaga – executive producer, writer, composer
Emeka Ejechi – featured artist
Shifi Emoefe – featured artist
Zeal Onyecheme – featured artist
Cynthia Morgan – featured artist
Melon – featured artist
Damini Ogulu – featured artist

Release history

References

2017 albums
Jesse Jagz albums
Albums produced by Jesse Jagz